"No One's Gonna Love You" is a song by American rock group Band of Horses. It was released in February 2008 as the second single from their second album Cease to Begin. In February 2011, three years after the single's original release, the song charted in Denmark. This was due to the band's performance of the song on the Danish talkshow Det Nye Talkshow - med Anders Lund Madsen. The song reached number 22 in the Danish Charts. The song has been used in several TV programmes, such as Chuck, One Tree Hill and Numb3rs, as well as appearing in the film Zombieland

Personnel
Ben Bridwell - Lead vocals, guitar
Rob Hampton - Guitar, bass guitar
Creighton Barrett - Drums
Ryan Monroe - Keyboards

Chart performance

Cee Lo Green version
The song was covered by American recording artist Cee Lo Green on his third studio album, The Lady Killer. The cover inspired the original artist, Band of Horses, to cover Green's song, "Georgia". Green released the first of two versions of "No One's Gonna Love You" on July 6, 2010 (see below). The single was available via digital download, as a promotional CD single and as a limited edition 7" vinyl single, which includes the Band of Horses' cover version of Green's song "Georgia" as the B-side.

Two versions of Green's song were produced and mixed by producer Paul Epworth. One version appears on the album, and a remix (titled "No One's Gonna Love You - Paul Epworth Mix") was released.

Music video
The Paul Epworth Mix was accompanied by a music video which premiered on July 6, 2010, on Green's official YouTube channel. The video is about a woman being evicted from her home and traveling across the country with her boyfriend. The video stars Jason Lee Parry and Jenny Sirney.

Also, two versions of the Paul Epworth Mix video were released - one with explicit images featuring brief nudity, and one with slight changes that omit the nudity.

Track listing
 Digital Download / Promotional CD Single
 "No One's Gonna Love You" (Paul Epworth Mix) - 3:24

 Limited Edition 7" Vinyl Single
 "No One's Gonna Love You" (Paul Epworth Mix) - 3:24
 "Georgia" (Band of Horses Version) - 3:58

Other covers
Kristina Train covered "No One's Gonna Love You" on her May 2013 album Dark Black.
Renee Fleming covered the song on her 2010 album Dark Hope.
Cee-Lo Green covered the song on his 2010 album The Lady Killer

References

External links
Band Of Horses official website
Cee-Lo Green official website
Band of Horses Official Video via Sub Pop's YouTube channel
 via Cee-Lo's YouTube channel
 via Cee-Lo's YouTube channel

2007 songs
2008 singles
Band of Horses songs
CeeLo Green songs
Sub Pop singles
2010 singles
Elektra Records singles
Songs written by Ben Bridwell
Rock ballads